Polyvinyl esters are a group of thermoplastic vinyl polymers. The most important examples of this group are polyvinyl acetate (PVAC) and polyvinyl propionate.

Production 
The radical polymerization of vinyl ester 1 (e.g. in case of vinyl acetate; R = CH3) yields polyvinyl ester 2:

Use 
The transparent polymers are used for the production of lacquers and as adhesives. The hydrolytic cleavage of the ester bonds of vinyl acetate is of industrial significance.

References 

Thermoplastics